Mal Webb (born 31 October 1966, Melbourne, Australia) is a singer, beatboxer and multi-instrumentalist who has performed in various groups in the Australian music scene. He records his own original songs as well as providing material for other artists. He is a founding member of The Oxo Cubans, Sock, Totally Gourdgeous, and Formidable Vegetable, as well as performing solo and as a duo with Kylie Morrigan. As a composer, he provided the soundtracks for The Adventures of Lano and Woodley  (ABC TV series 1997–1999), Woodley (ABC TV series 2012) and Wishworks' puppet show, Whispering Smith (UK 2015). In 2018, he premiered his work, "Notey and Noisy, a Sound Science Mathemusical". His yodelling vocal technique has been studied using endoscopy.

Solo discography
Trainer Wheels (2000)
3 Cheers for Peace & Quiet (2005)
Dodgy (2008)
Live and Instructional DVD (2011)
"Not Nor Mal" (2016)

References

External links
Official website

1966 births
Living people
Musicians from Melbourne
Australian harmonica players